Andorra competed at the 1996 Summer Olympics in Atlanta, United States.

Athletics

Men

Judo 

Andorra sent one competitor to the Olympic Games in Judo.

Sailing

Men

Women

Shooting

Men

Swimming 

Andorra sent two competitors to the Olympic games in swimming.

Men

Women

References
sports-reference

Nations at the 1996 Summer Olympics
1996 Summer Olympics
1996 in Andorran sport